The Carleton Ravens men's basketball team represents Carleton University in the Ontario University Athletics conference of U Sports men's basketball. The Ravens have captured 17 W. P. McGee Trophy national championship wins, more than any top division school in Canada or the United States, and are the reigning national champions (2023). In addition, the Ravens have earned the Wilson Cup, awarded to the OUA champions, 12 times: 2003 to 2005, 2008 to 2010, 2012 to 2013, 2015, and 2018 to 2020.

On the same day in 2023 (March 12), both the men’s and women’s teams won the national title, something no school had accomplished since 1985, when the Victoria Vikes were double champions. The twin feat was also accomplished in the same province—Nova Scotia—though in different cities, as the men played in Halifax, the women, in Sydney. The men’s game on that day went to double overtime, a first for the title game. It set a record for number of points by any team in the finals (109), in a match that also saw the highest number of combined points scored (213).

History
Below is the program's regular season record since the 1996–97 season.

Season-by-season Record

Capital Hoops Classic

U Sports Final 8 results

Individual Leader Scoring

Awards and honours

U Sports Awards

Jack Donohue Trophy
MVP of the National Championship Tournament

2023 Aiden Warnholtz
2022 Alain Louis
2020 Isiah Osborne
2019 Eddie Ekiyor
2017 Kaza Kajami-Keane
2016 Connor Wood
2015 Philip Scrubb
2014 Tyson Hinz
2013 Thomas Scrubb
2012 Philip Scrubb
2011 Tyson Hinz
2009 Stuart Turnbull
2007 Aaron Doornekamp
2006 Osvaldo Jeanty
2005 Mike Smart
2004 Mike Smart
2003 Osvaldo Jeanty

Mike Moser Memorial Trophy
Outstanding Male Basketball Player

2021-22 Lloyd Pandi
2016-17 Connor Wood
2013-14 Philip Scrubb
2012-13 Philip Scrubb
2011-12 Philip Scrubb
2010-11 Tyson Hinz
2007-08 Aaron Doornekamp
2006-07 Osvaldo Jeanty
2005-06 Osvaldo Jeanty

Dr. Peter Mullins Trophy
Rookie of the Year

2019-20 Lloyd Pandi
2010-11 Philip Scrubb

First Team All-Canadians

2023 Aiden Warnholtz
2022 Lloyd Pandi
2019 Eddie Ekiyor
2017 Connor Wood
2015 Philip Scrubb 
Thomas Scrubb
2014 Philip Scrubb
2013 Tyson Hinz
Philip Scrubb
2012 Tyson Hinz
Philip Scrubb
2011 Tyson Hinz
2009 Stuart Turnbull
2008 Aaron Doornekamp
2007 Osvaldo Jeanty
2006 Osvaldo Jeanty
2005 Michael Smart
2003 Rob Smart Jr.
2002 Jafeth Maseruka
1969 Denis Schuthe

OUA Awards

OUA All-Stars

University Awards
Tyson Hinz, 2010-11 Carleton Ravens Male Athlete of the Year 
Thomas Scrubb, 2014-15 Carleton Ravens Male Athlete of the Year 
Kaza Kajami-Keane, 2016-17 Carleton Ravens Male Athlete of the Year 
Eddie Ekiyor  2018-19 Carleton Ravens Male Athlete of the Year

Ravens in pro basketball

Players

Head coaches

References

 
Carleton Ravens basketball
Sports teams in Ottawa
U Sports basketball
U Sports men's basketball